Deportivo Pucallpa is a Peruvian football club, playing in the city of Pucallpa, Ucayali, Peru.

History
They were originally called Deportivo COOPTRIP, and played in the 1985 Torneo Descentralizado.

The club participated in 1985 Torneo Descentralizado until 1986 Torneo Descentralizado when was relegated. Deportivo Pucallpa was the 1986 Central Zone winner and classified to Liguilla Regional but was eliminated by San Agustín.

Rivalries
Deportivo Pucallpa has had a long-standing rivalry with local club Deportivo Bancos.

Honours

National
Liga Distrital de Callería: 1
Winners (1): 2011

Role in 1987 Alianza Lima plane crash
In the 1987 Alianza Lima plane crash, Alianza Lima were flying to Lima from Pucallpa after an away match at the club in the Torneo Descentralizado.

See also
List of football clubs in Peru
Peruvian football league system

References

External links
RSSSF - Perú 1986
RSSSF - Perú 1987
RSSSF - Perú 1988

Football clubs in Peru